Neumann is German and Yiddish for "new man", and one of the 20 most common German surnames.

People

 Von Neumann family, a Jewish Hungarian noble family

A–G
Adam Neumann (born 1979), Israeli-born entrepreneur and founder of WeWork
Alfred Neumann (writer), German  writer
Alfred Neumann (East Germany), East German politician
Angela von Neumann, American artist
Arthur Henry Neumann, British born hunter and explorer 
Bernd Neumann, German politician
Balthasar Neumann (1687–1753), Bohemian German architect
Bernhard Neumann, German-born mathematician
Bernard de Neumann (also Bernhard von Neumann), English mathematician, computer scientist, naval historian
Birthe Neumann, Danish actress
Carl Neumann, German mathematician
 Neumann boundary condition
Caspar Neumann, Prussian clergyman and statistician
Caspar Neumann (chemist), German/Polish chemist and apothecary 
Christoph Neumann (born 1964), German politician
Dave Neumann, Canadian politician
Elsa Neumann, German physicist
Erich Neumann (politician), Nazi German politician
Erich Neumann (psychologist), German psychologist
Franz Ernst Neumann, German physicist and mathematician
Franz Leopold Neumann, German-American legal scholar and theoretician
Gerhard Neumann, American aviation engineer
Gerda Neumann (1915–1947), Danish film actress
Guenter Neumann, German agricultural scientist
Günter Neumann (singer), German cabaret artist
Gustaf Adolf Jakob Neumann, Austrian newspaper editor
Gustav Neumann, German chess player

H–M
Hanna Neumann, German-born mathematician
Hannah Neumann, German politician
Heinrich Neumann von Héthárs, Austrian medical doctor
Heinz Neumann (1902–1937), German KPD politician
Herbert Neumann, German football player/manager
Hildegard Neumann, Nazi German concentration camp administrator
Ilana Neumann, Dominican Republic politician
Iver B. Neumann, Norwegian political scientist and social anthropologist
Saint John Nepomucene Neumann, American clergyman
John von Neumann, Hungarian-American mathematician, physicist, computer scientist, engineer and polymath
Kamila Stösslová (née Neumannová), lover of Leoš Janáček
Karl Eugen Neumann, Austrian translator and Buddhist activist
Karl Friedrich Neumann, German orientalist
Kateřina Neumannová, Czech cross-country skier
Kurt Neumann (director), German-born film director
Liselotte Neumann, Swedish golfer
Luise Neumann, German actress
Mani Neumann, German musician
Mark Neumann, American politician
Martin Neumann, German politician
Mic Neumann, American producer/director, creator of Kung Faux
Michael Neumann, Canadian philosopher
Monica von Neumann, American socialite

N–Z
Nicole Neumann, Argentinian model
Oscar Rudolph Neumann (1867–1946), German ornithologist
Otto Neumann (athlete) (1902-1990), German sprinter
Otto Neumann (artist) (1895-1975), German Expressionist painter and printmaker
Otto C. Neumann (1936-1991), American politician
Paul Neumann (disambiguation), several people
Pertti Neumann, Finnish pop musician
Peter Neumann (Canadian football) (1931–2020), Canadian football player
Peter de Neumann (1917–1972), ["The Man From Timbuctoo"], British mariner
Peter G. Neumann (born 1932), American computer scientist
Peter M. Neumann (1940–2020), British mathematician
Philipp von Neumann (1781–1851), Austrian diplomat
Randy Neumann (born 1948),  American boxer and referee
Robert G. Neumann (1916–1999), American politician and diplomat
Robin Neumann, Dutch swimmer
Ronald E. Neumann (born 1944), American diplomat
Sigmund Neumann (1904–1962), German political scientist and sociologist
Therese Neumann (1898–1962), German mystic
Thomas Neumann (born 1977), German computer scientist
Václav Neumann (1920–1995), Czech conductor and musician
Victor Neumann (born 1953), Romanian historian, political analyst, and professor 
Víctor Neumann-Lara (1933–2004), Mexican mathematician
Werner Neumann (1905–1991), German musicologist
Werner Neumann (jazz musician), German jazz guitarist and music lecturer
Werner Neumann (judge) (born 1953), German jurist, lawyer and judge
Werner Neumann (officer) (1905–1970), German general
Wolfgang Neumann (born 1945), Austrian opera tenor

See also
Georg Neumann, microphone manufacturer
Neumann University in Aston, Pennsylvania
Neumann Bygg, a Norwegian buildings supplies retailer owned by the Danish Stark Group
Neuman
Naumann
Niemann
Najman, Yiddish variant of Neumann

German-language surnames